Beverly Whipple is Professor Emerita at Rutgers University and a professional author and sexologist. She is a co-author of the publication The G Spot and Other Recent Discoveries About Human Sexuality.

Career
Following a career in nursing, much of her academic work has been concerned with the enhancement of female sexual function. In 1981, she was co-author of Addiego et al.'''s "Female ejaculation: a case study." The paper was presented in The Journal of Sex Research and includes the first published instance of the term "G-Spot".

Publications
Following the book, Whipple continued to publicize her work, including a 9 min video made in 1981 Orgasmic Expulsions of Fluid in the Sexually Stimulated Female. In 1984, the Journal of Sex Research described the debate surrounding female ejaculation as 'heated'.

Her techniques include using fMRI scans to gather evidence on what is happening in the brain. Her animal experiments contributed to the isolation of the vasoactive intestinal peptide and the discovery that orgasms can be rerouted to the brain via the vagus nerve without using the spinal cord, thus enabling females with spinal cord injury to achieve orgasm by psychological stimulation alone.

Books

The following is a list of books that have been written or co-written by Whipple.The G Spot: And Other Recent Discoveries About Human Sexuality (1982) with Alice Khan Ladas and John D. PerrySafe Encounters: How Women Can Say Yes to Pleasure and No to Unsafe Sex (1989) with Gina OgdenSmart Women, Strong Bones (2000) with Ronda GatesOutwitting Osteoporosis: The Smart Woman's Guide To Bone Health (2003) with Ronda GatesThe G Spot: And Other Discoveries About Human Sexuality (2005) with Alice Khan Ladas and John D. PerryThe Science of Orgasm (2006) with Barry R. Komisaruk and Carlos Beyer-FloresWomen's Sexualities: Generations of Women Share Intimate Secrets of Sexual Self-Acceptance (2006) with Carol Rinkleib EllisonThe Orgasm Answer Guide'' (2009) with Barry Komisaruk, Sara Nasserzadeh and Carlos Beyer-Flores

References

External links
 Ernst Gräfenberg: From Berlin to New York by Beverly Whipple, Ph.D, RN, FAAN Professor Rutgers, The State University of New Jersey, USA

American relationships and sexuality writers
American sexologists
Sex educators
Mammal female reproductive system
Living people
Year of birth missing (living people)
Rutgers University faculty
American women non-fiction writers
American women academics
21st-century American women